Lyallpur Khalsa College of Engineering was founded by Khalsa College Lyallpur Educational Trust in the year 2013, near the premises of Lyallpur Khalsa College for Women, Cantt. Road Jalandhar.

Lyallpur Khalsa College of Engineering echoes the vision of its founders who believed that the best way of surviving change is to initiate it. The Institute strives to develop leaders keeping in view the expectations of the present day business world.

External links

Engineering colleges in Punjab, India
Education in Jalandhar
Educational institutions established in 2013
2013 establishments in Punjab, India